Karl Georg Büchner (17 October 1813 – 19 February 1837) was a German dramatist and writer of poetry and prose, considered part of the Young Germany movement. He was also a revolutionary and the brother of physician and philosopher Ludwig Büchner. His literary achievements, though few in number, are generally held in great esteem in Germany and it is widely believed that, had it not been for his early death, he might have joined such central German literary figures as Johann Wolfgang von Goethe and Friedrich Schiller at the summit of their profession.

Life and career 
Born in Goddelau (now part of Riedstadt) in the Grand Duchy of Hesse as the son of a physician, Büchner attended the Darmstadt gymnasium, a humanistic secondary school.

In 1828, he became interested in politics and joined a circle of William Shakespeare aficionados, which later on probably became the Gießen and Darmstadt section of the Society for Human Rights.

In 1831, at age 18, he began to study medicine in Strasbourg. In Strasbourg, he immersed himself in French literature and political thought. He was influenced by the utopian communist theories of François-Noël Babeuf and Claude Henri de Saint-Simon. In 1833 he moved to Gießen and continued his studies at the local university.

While Büchner continued his studies in Gießen, he established a secret society dedicated to the revolutionary cause. In July 1834, with the help of evangelical theologian Friedrich Ludwig Weidig, he published the leaflet Der Hessische Landbote, a revolutionary pamphlet critical of social injustice in the Grand Duchy of Hesse. The authorities charged them with treason and issued a warrant for their arrest. Weidig was arrested, tortured and later died in prison in Darmstadt; Büchner managed to flee across the border to Strasbourg where he wrote most of his literary work and translated two French plays by Victor Hugo, Lucrèce Borgia and Marie Tudor. Two years later, his medical dissertation, "Mémoire sur le Système Nerveux du Barbeaux (Cyprinus barbus L.)" was published in Paris and Strasbourg. In October 1836, after receiving his M.D. and being appointed by the University of Zürich as a lecturer in anatomy, Büchner relocated to Zürich where he spent his final months writing and teaching until his death from typhus at the age of twenty-three. 

His first play, Dantons Tod (Danton's Death), about the French revolution, was published in 1835, followed by Lenz (first partly published in Karl Gutzkow's and Wienberg's Deutsche Revue, which was quickly banned). Lenz is a novella based on the life of the Sturm und Drang poet Jakob Michael Reinhold Lenz. In 1836 his second play, Leonce and Lena, satirized the nobility. His unfinished and most famous play, Woyzeck, exists only in fragments and was published posthumously.

Legacy
By the 1870s, Büchner was nearly forgotten in Germany when Karl Emil Franzos edited his works; these later became a major influence on the naturalist and expressionist movements. Arnold Zweig described Lenz, Büchner's only work of prose fiction, as "the beginning of modern European prose".

The play Woyzeck became the basis for many adaptations including Alban Berg's landmark atonal opera Wozzeck which premiered in 1925, and Werner Herzog's 1979 film Woyzeck (see main article, Woyzeck, for a full list).

A literary prize in Germany, the Georg Büchner Prize, is awarded annually. It was created in 1923.

Works
 The Hessian Courier, 1834 – in cooperation with Friedrich Ludwig Weidig (Flugschrift)
 Danton's Death, 1835 (Drama)
 Lenz, 1835 (Short story)
 Leonce and Lena, 1836 (Comedy)
 Woyzeck, 1837 (Drama – fragment)
 Pietro Aretino, his drama about Pietro Aretino, has been lost.
 Translations:
 Lucrezia Borgia, 1835 (Of the play by Victor Hugo)
 Maria Tudor, 1835 (Of the play by Victor Hugo)

Editions
Georg Büchner, Werke und Briefe. Münchner Ausgabe (dtv, 1997). .

Translations
 Red Yucca – German Poetry in Translation  (trans. Eric Plattner)
Georg Büchner, Complete Plays and Prose, trans. Carl Richard Mueller (Hill and Wang, 1963)
Georg Büchner, The Complete Plays: Danton's Death; Leonce and Lena; Woyzeck; Lenz; the Hessian Messenger; on Cranial Nerves; Selected Letters trans. John Reddick  (Penguin Classics, 1993)  .
Georg Büchner, Danton's Death, Leonce and Lena and Woyzeck, trans. Victor Price,  (Oxford World's Classics, 1998). .

Notes

References
 Garland, Henry and Mary (Eds.). The Oxford Companion to German Literature. 2nd ed. by Mary Garland. Oxford: Oxford University Press, 1986. "Büchner, Georg", p. 121.
 Heiner Boehncke, Peter Brunner, Hans Sarkowicz. Die Büchners oder der Wunsch, die Welt zu verändern. Societäts-Verlag, Frankfurt am Main, 2008.

External links

 
 
  
 
 Series on life of Georg Büchner, by Sybille Fuchs, reviewing Georg Büchner: Revolutionary with pen and scalpel, an exhibition from 13 October 2013 to 16 February 2014 at the Darmstadium Conference Centre, Darmstadt:   Part 1 – Part 2 – Part 3 – Part 4 – Part 5
 Büchner's birthplace

1813 births
1837 deaths
People from Groß-Gerau (district)
People from the Grand Duchy of Hesse
German non-fiction writers
German medical writers
German Expressionist writers
Writers from Hesse
19th-century German dramatists and playwrights
People associated with the University of Zurich
University of Strasbourg alumni
Deaths from typhus
Infectious disease deaths in Switzerland
German male dramatists and playwrights
German-language poets
19th-century German poets
German male poets
19th-century German male writers
19th-century German writers
German male non-fiction writers